This is a list of broadcast television stations that are licensed in the U.S. state of Hawaii.  Each of the three municipal counties — Honolulu County, Maui County and Hawaii County — has its own set of stations.  Kauai County has repeaters which broadcast Honolulu's stations through its islands.

Full-power stations
VC refers to the station's PSIP virtual channel. RF refers to the station's physical RF channel.

Defunct full-power stations
Channel 13: KHVH-TV (original) - Honolulu (5/5/1957-7/16/1958)

LPTV stations

Translators

Other islands
Many inhabited areas of Molokai and Lanai are within range of TV stations and repeaters located on facing areas of Oahu and Maui. Likewise, viewers on Niihau are served by transmitters on the west of Kauai.

Early conversion to digital
On January 15, 2009, Hawaii became the first state in the United States to permanently have its television stations switch from analog to digital early. Hawaii's full-power TV stations, including network affiliates and independent stations, ceased analog broadcasting at noon on that date. With the exception of residents on Kauai, households that receive TV signals over the air will need to connect a converter box to sets in order to continue watching TV, since Kauai is the only part of Hawaii that receives over-the-air television signals via low-power translators that are not affected by the DTV transition.

Existing analog facilities at Maui's Haleakalā volcano are to be removed due to ongoing interference with astronomy equipment operated under the United States Department of Defense and the University of Hawaii. The digital stations are being deployed using new facilities at Ulupalakua and the old towers will be removed before the Hawaiian petrels' nesting season begins in March.  By making the switch early, the broadcast towers atop Haleakalā near the birds' nesting grounds can be dismantled without interfering with their habits.

References

External links
Hawaii Radio & Television Guide

Television
Hawaii